Gluggarnir is a mountain in the Faroe Islands.  At 610 metres, it is the highest mountain on the southernmost island, Suðuroy. The mountain is located between the villages of Fámjin and Trongisvágur.

References 

Mountains of the Faroe Islands
Suðuroy